Lamberto Vera Avellana (February 12, 1915 – April 25, 1991) was a prominent Filipino film and stage director. Despite considerable budgetary limitations that hampered the post-war Filipino film industry, Avellana's films such as Anak Dalita and Badjao attained international acclaim. In 1976, Avellana was named by President Ferdinand Marcos as the first National Artist of the Philippines for Film. While Avellana remains an important figure in Filipino cinema, his reputation as a film director has since been eclipsed by the next wave of Filipino film directors who emerged in the 1970s, such as Lino Brocka and Ishmael Bernal.

Life
Born in Bontoc, Mountain Province, Avellana was educated at the Ateneo de Manila AB '37, where he developed what turned out to be a lifelong interest in the theater. He taught at the Ateneo after graduation and married his teenage sweetheart Daisy Hontiveros, an actress who eventually also became a National Artist in 1999.

Film career
Avellana made his film debut with Sakay in 1939, a biopic on the early 20th-century Filipino revolutionary Macario Sakay. The film, though a box-office flop, was particularly distinguished for its realism which was atypical of Filipino cinema at the time. The treatment is the subject of some controversy today. Avellana's Sakay toed the line with the American-fostered perception of Sakay as a mere bandit, different from the current-day appreciation of Sakay as a fighter for Filipino independence. Raymond Red's 1993 film, Sakay hews closer to this modern view of Sakay.

Leopoldo Salcedo, who played Sakay in the 1939 Avellana version, portrayed Sakay's father in the 1993 version in his final film role.

Avellana directed more than 70 films in a career that spanned six decades. Anak Dalita (1956) and Badjao (1957) perhaps stand as the most prominent works from his oeuvre. Anak Dalita, which was named Best Film at the 1956 Asia-Pacific Film Festival, was a realistic portrayal of poverty-stricken Filipinos coping with the aftermath of World War II. Badjao was a love-story set in Mindanao between a man from a sea-dwelling indigenous Badjao family and a woman belonging to a prominent Tausug clan. Rolf Bayer was the screenwriter for both films.

On December 30, 1990, Avellana directed the first live reenactment of José Rizal's execution to be held on Rizal Day in Rizal Park.

Filmography

Sakay (1939)
Inday (1940)
Rosalinda (1941)
Ikaw Pala (1941)
Death March (1946)
Hacendera (1947)
Tandang Sora (1947)
Sa Ngiti Mo Lamang (1947)
Hagibis (1947)
Pista ng Bayan (1948)
A La Viva! (1948)
Ronquillo: Tiagong Akyat (1949)
Hantik (1950)
Ang Bombero (Kaaway ng Apoy) (1950)
Prinsipe Amante (1950)
In Despair (1950)Satur (1951)Prinsipe Amante sa Rubitanya (1951)Pag-asa (1951)Amor Mio (1951)Korea (1952)Aklat ng Buhay (1952)Haring Solomon at Reyna Sheba (1952)Loida: Ang Aking Pag-ibig (1953)Huk sa Bagong Pamumuhay (1953)Hiyasmin (1953)Kandelerong Pilak (1954)Lapu-Lapu (1955)Saydwok Bendor (1955)No Money, No Honey (1956) Anak Dalita (1956)Medalyong Perlas ("Eskirol" segment, 1956)Kumander 13 (1956)Walang Sugat (1957)Badjao (1957)Sergeant Hassan (1957)Rosalina (1957)Faithful (1958)Kundiman ng Lahi (1959)Cry Freedom (1959)Bus to Bataan (1961)Death Was a Stranger (1963)No Way Out (1963)Scout Rangers (1964)A Portrait of the Artist as Filipino (1965)Tagumpay ng Mahirap ("The Boy" segment, 1965)Operation XYZ (1966)Claudia (1966)Destination: Vietnam (1968)Kumander Dimas (1968)Ang Bukas Ay Atin (1973)Fe, Esperanza, Caridad (with Cirio H. Santiago and Gerardo de León, 1974)Kapitan Kulas: Ang Kilabot ng Sierra Madre (1975)Ang Pag-ibig Ko'y Huwag Mong Sukatin (1975)Waywaya (1982)

Personal life
Lamberto died on April 25, 1991, in Manila, Philippines at the age of 76.

References

 Additional sources Filipinos in History: Volume III'', National Historical Institute (Manila, 1996)

External links

1915 births
1991 deaths
Ateneo de Manila University alumni
Academic staff of Ateneo de Manila University
Filipino film directors
National Artists of the Philippines
People from Mountain Province